Peabody–Darst–Webbe is a neighborhood of St. Louis, Missouri.  It is also called the Near Southside neighborhood.  Peabody–Darst–Webbe is an area bounded by S. Tucker Blvd. on the east, Chouteau Ave. on the north, Dolman Street on the west, and the I-55/I-44 interchange on the south.

Demographics

In 2020 Peabody Darst Webbe's racial makeup was 79.7% Black, 15.3% White, 0.1% Native American, 0.8% Asian, 3.6% Two or More Races, and 0.6% Some Other Race. 1.6% of the population were of Hispanic or Latino origin.

See also
 The Ville, St. Louis another neighborhood that used to have a city hospital

References

External links
 Peabody, Darst, Webbe Neighborhood (City of St. Louis)

Neighborhoods in St. Louis